Aşağıyabanlı is a village in the Ağın District of Elazığ Province in Turkey. Its population is 27 (2021). The village is populated by Turkmens.

References

Villages in Ağın District